Louis Angus Mongello is a United States author, entrepreneur, and expert on Walt Disney World. He is the host and producer of the WDW Radio Disney podcast, which has been named Best Travel Podcast by the Podcast Awards for nine consecutive years. Through online communities and his radio show, he promotes Walt Disney World using a variety of media.

Biography
Mongello holds a bachelor's degree in Sociology from Villanova University and a Juris Doctor from Seton Hall University. He practiced law for nine years before forming his own computer consulting and web design company, Imagine Enterprises. He was the Chief Technology Officer and Director of Operations for a medical imaging company in Edison, New Jersey, before moving to Florida to pursue his interest in Disney.

Mongello is the author of the Walt Disney World Trivia Book series, 102 Ways to Save Money For and At Walt Disney World, and Audio Tours of Walt Disney World, which he also narrates.

Mongello also manages a charitable group named the Dream Team Project, which raises money to pay for children with serious illnesses to visit Walt Disney World. To date, project had raised more than $250,000.00 for the Make-A-Wish Foundation of America.

Books
Mongello's first book was featured in the Fall 2005 issue of Seton Hall Magazine, Staten Island Parent, and the December 2004 issue of The Bookwatch.
 102 Ways to Save Money For and at Walt Disney World 
 The Walt Disney World Trivia Book, Secrets History & Fun Facts Behind the Magic 
 The Walt Disney World Trivia Book 2, More Secrets History & Fun Facts Behind the Magic 
 Walt Disney World Trivia 2009 Calendar
 Virtual AUDIO TOURS of Walt Disney World

References

Living people
Year of birth missing (living people)
Villanova University alumni
Seton Hall University School of Law alumni
American travel writers
American male non-fiction writers